Mount Cokely, formerly known as The Hump and at times misspelled in some sources as Mount Copely and Mount Coakely, is a mountain on Vancouver Island, British Columbia, Canada, located  east of Port Alberni and  north of Mount Arrowsmith in Cameron Land District.  The peak was named for Sterling Cokely (1884–1956), a British Columbia Land Surveyor.

See also
List of mountains in Canada

References

Vancouver Island Ranges
Alberni Valley
One-thousanders of British Columbia